"" was a personal anthem to Francis II, Emperor of the Holy Roman Empire and later of the Austrian Empire, with lyrics by Lorenz Leopold Haschka (1749–1827) and music by Joseph Haydn. It is sometimes called the "Kaiserhymne" (Emperor's Hymn). Haydn's tune has since been widely employed in other contexts: in works of classical music, in Christian hymns, in alma maters, and as the tune of the "Deutschlandlied", the national anthem of Germany.

Words and music

The lyrics are as follows:
Gott erhalte Franz den Kaiser, unsern guten Kaiser Franz!
Lange lebe Franz der Kaiser, in des Glückes hellstem Glanz!
Ihm erblühen Lorbeerreiser, wo er geht, zum Ehrenkranz!
Gott erhalte Franz den Kaiser, unsern guten Kaiser Franz!
God save Francis the Emperor, our good Emperor Francis!
Long live Francis the Emperor in the brightest splendor of bliss!
May laurel branches bloom for him, wherever he goes, as a wreath of honor.
God save Francis the Emperor, our good Emperor Francis!

History
The song was written when Austria was seriously threatened by Revolutionary France and patriotic sentiments ran high. The story of the song's genesis was narrated in 1847 by Anton Schmid, who was Custodian of the Austrian National Library in Vienna:

Saurau himself later wrote:
I had a text fashioned by the worthy poet Haschka; and to have it set to music, I turned to our immortal compatriot Haydn, who, I felt, was the only man capable of creating something that could be placed at the side of ... "God Save the King".

"Gott erhalte Franz den Kaiser" was first performed on the Emperor's birthday, 12 February 1797. It proved popular, and came to serve unofficially as Austria's first national anthem.

Composition
As elsewhere in Haydn's music, it has been conjectured that Haydn took part of his material from folk songs he knew. This hypothesis has never achieved unanimous agreement, the alternative being that Haydn's original tune was adapted by the people in various versions as folk songs. For discussion, see Haydn and folk music.

Irrespective of the original source, Haydn's own compositional efforts went through multiple drafts, discussed by Rosemary Hughes in her biography of the composer. Hughes reproduces the draft fragment given below (i.e., the fifth through eighth lines of the song) and writes: "His sketches, preserved in the Vienna National Library, show the self-denial and economy with which he struggled to achieve [the song's] seemingly inevitable climax, pruning the earlier and more obviously interesting version of the fifth and sixth lines, which would have anticipated, and so lessened, its overwhelming effect."

The original version of the song (see autograph score, above) included a single line for voice with a rather crude piano accompaniment, with no dynamic indications and what David Wyn Jones calls "an unevenness of keyboard sonority". This version was printed in many copies (two different printers were assigned to the work) and sent to theatres and opera houses across the Austrian territories with instructions for performance. The Vienna premiere took place in the Burgtheater on 12 February 1797, the day the song was officially released. The Emperor was present, attending a performance of Dittersdorf's opera Doktor und Apotheker and Joseph Weigl's ballet Alonzo und Cora. The occasion celebrated his 29th birthday.

Not long after, Haydn later wrote three additional versions of his song:

He first wrote a version for orchestra, called "much more refined" by Jones.
During 1797, Haydn was working on a commission for six string quartets from Count Joseph Erdödy. He conceived the idea of composing a slow movement for one of the quartets consisting of the Emperor's hymn as theme, followed by four variations, each involving the melody played by one member of the quartet. The finished quartet, now often called the "Emperor" quartet, was published as the third of the Opus 76 quartets, dedicated to Count Erdödy. It is perhaps Haydn's most famous work in this genre.
The last version Haydn wrote was a piano reduction of the quartet movement, published by Artaria in 1799. The publisher printed it with the original cruder piano version of the theme, though a modern edition corrects this error.

Haydn's own view of the song
Joseph Haydn seems to have been particularly fond of his creation. During his frail and sickly old age (1802–1809), the composer often would struggle to the piano to play his song, often with great feeling, as a form of consolation; and as his servant Johann Elssler narrated, it was the last music Haydn ever played:
The Kaiser Lied was still played three times a day, though, but on 26 May [1809] at half-past midday the Song was played for the last time and that 3 times over, with such expression and taste, well! that our good Papa was astonished about it himself and said he hadn't played the Song like that for a long time and was very pleased about it and felt well altogether till evening at 5 o'clock then our good Papa began to lament that he didn't feel well...

Elssler goes on to narrate the composer's final decline and death, which occurred on 31 May.

Later uses of the tune in classical music
Later composers in the Western classical canon have repeatedly quoted or otherwise employed Haydn's tune, as is demonstrated by the following chronological list. As the tune was widely known, the uses by other composers were heard as quotations and served as an emblem of Austria, of Austrian patriotism, or of the Austrian monarchy.

Ludwig van Beethoven quotes the last four bars in "Es ist vollbracht", WoO 97, the finale of Georg Friedrich Treitschke's singspiel Die Ehrenpforten (1815). The work celebrates the end of the Napoleonic Wars, essentially the same conflict that gave rise to Haydn's original hymn. It is seldom performed today.
Carl Czerny wrote Variations on "Gott erhalte Franz den Kaiser" for piano and orchestra or piano and string quartet, his Op. 73 (1824).
Philipp Jakob Riotte quotes the tune at the end of his battle piece Die Schlacht bei Leipzig in order to illustrate the joy after Napoleon's defeat in the Battle of Leipzig.
Gioachino Rossini used the tune in the banquet scene of his 1825 opera Il viaggio a Reims for the German Baron Trombonok.
Niccolò Paganini wrote a set of variations on this tune for violin and orchestra in 1828, under the title Maestosa Sonata Sentimentale.
Gaetano Donizetti used the tune in his opera Maria Stuarda (1835), at act 3, scene 8, "Deh! Tu di un'umile preghiera ..."
Clara Schumann used the tune as the basis for her "Souvenir de Vienne", Op. 9 (1838) for solo piano.
Bedřich Smetana used the tune in his Festive Symphony (1853), which the composer intended to dedicate to the Emperor Franz Joseph I of Austria.
Henryk Wieniawski wrote a set of variations on the tune for unaccompanied violin (Variations on the Austrian National Anthem, from L'école Moderne, Op. 10; 1853).
Pyotr Ilyich Tchaikovsky arranged the work for orchestra in 1874, apparently in connection with a visit to Russia by the Austrian Emperor. The arrangement was published only in 1970.
Anton Bruckner wrote his Improvisationskizze Ischl 1890 to be played on the organ during the wedding of Archduchess Marie Valerie of Austria.
Béla Bartók employed the theme in his symphonic poem Kossuth (1903); in this patriotic work about the failed Hungarian Revolution of 1848 the theme serves as an emblem for the Austrian enemy.

Use in national anthems, alma maters, and hymns

Austria-Hungary

After the death of Francis in 1835, the tune was given new lyrics that praised his successor, Ferdinand: "Segen Öst'reichs hohem Sohne / Unserm Kaiser Ferdinand!" ("Blessings to Austria's high son / Our Emperor Ferdinand!"). After Ferdinand's abdication in 1848, the original lyrics were used again because his successor (Francis Joseph) was also named Francis. However, in 1854, yet again new lyrics were selected: "Gott erhalte, Gott beschütze / Unsern Kaiser, unser Land!" ("God preserve, God protect / Our Emperor, our country!").

There were versions of the hymn in several languages of the Austro-Hungarian Empire (e.g., Czech, Serbo-Croatian, Slovene, Hungarian, Ukrainian, Polish, Italian).

At the end of the First World War in 1918, the Austro-Hungarian Empire was abolished and divided into multiple states, one of them being the residual state of Austria, which was a republic and had no emperor. The tune ceased to be used for official purposes. When the last Emperor, Charles I, died in 1922, monarchists created an original stanza for his son Otto von Habsburg. Since the emperor was in fact never restored, this version never attained official standing.

The hymn was revived in 1929 with completely new lyrics, known as "Sei gesegnet ohne Ende", which remained the national anthem of Austria until the Anschluss. The first stanza of the hymn's 1854 version was sung in 1989 during the funeral of Empress Zita of Austria and again in 2011 during the funeral of her son Otto von Habsburg.

Germany
Long after Haydn's death, his melody was used as the tune for Hoffmann von Fallersleben's poem Das Lied der Deutschen (1841). The third stanza (which begins with "Einigkeit und Recht und Freiheit") is sung to the same melody, and is the present national anthem of Germany and formerly of West Germany. The first verse of Fallersleben's poem was formerly the national anthem of the Weimar Republic, and later, Nazi Germany.

Hymns
In the ordinary nomenclature of hymn tunes, the melody of "Gott erhalte Franz den Kaiser" is classified as 87.87D trochaic metre. When employed in a hymn it is sometimes known as "Austria", or "Austrian Hymn". It has been paired with various lyrics.

Lyrics by John Newton which begin "Glorious Things of Thee Are Spoken/Zion, city of our God"
Lyrics by Samuel Longfellow which begin "Light of ages and of nations"
Lyrics by an unknown author which begin "Praise the Lord, Ye Heavens Adore Him"

School Hymns 
 The alma mater of Columbia University, "Stand, Columbia"
 The alma mater of the University of Pittsburgh
 The alma mater of Western Reserve University (merged into Case Western Reserve University)

Lyrics

1797 original version 

During Haydn's lifetime, his friend the musicologist Charles Burney, made an English translation of the first verse which is more poetical albeit less literal than the one given above:

God preserve the Emp'ror Francis
Sov'reign ever good and great;
Save, o save him from mischances
In Prosperity and State!
May his Laurels ever blooming
Be by Patriot Virtue fed;
May his worth the world illumine
And bring back the Sheep misled!
God preserve our Emp'ror Francis!
Sov'reign ever good and great.

Burney's penultimate couplet about sheep has no counterpart in the original German and appears to be Burney's own contribution.

1854 version 

For translations into several of the languages that were spoken in the Austrian Empire, see Translations of Gott erhalte Franz den Kaiser.

See also
Heil dir im Siegerkranz

Notes

References

External links

1797 compositions
Compositions by Joseph Haydn
Historical national anthems
Royal anthems
National symbols of Austria-Hungary
European anthems
German-language songs
National anthem compositions in G major
Francis II, Holy Roman Emperor